Cazzaniga is an Italian surname. Notable people with the surname include:

 Alicia Cazzaniga (1928-1968), Argentine modernist architect
 Mario Cazzaniga (1900–?), Italian water polo player
 Tommaso Cazzaniga (born 1998), Italian football player

Italian-language surnames